Pauline of Waldeck and Pyrmont (Pauline Emma Auguste Hermine; 19 October 18553 July 1925) was a member of the House of Waldeck and Pyrmont and a Princess of Waldeck and Pyrmont. Through her marriage to Alexis, Prince of Bentheim and Steinfurt, Pauline was also a member of the Princely House of Bentheim and Steinfurt and Princess consort of Bentheim and Steinfurt from 28 September 1890 to 21 January 1919.

Early life
Pauline was born in Arolsen, Principality of Waldeck and Pyrmont on 19 October 1855 and was the second-eldest child and daughter of George Victor, Prince of Waldeck and Pyrmont and his first wife Princess Helena of Nassau. Pauline was an elder sister of Marie, Crown Princess of Württemberg, Emma, Queen of the Netherlands, Helena, Duchess of Albany, Friedrich, Prince of Waldeck and Pyrmont, and Elisabeth, Princess of Erbach-Schönberg.

Marriage and issue
Pauline married Alexis, Hereditary Prince of Bentheim and Steinfurt, fourth child and eldest son of Ludwig Wilhelm, Prince of Bentheim and Steinfurt and his wife Landgravine Bertha of Hesse-Philippsthal-Barchfeld, on 7 May 1881 in Arolsen, Principality of Waldeck and Pyrmont. Pauline and Alexis had eight children:

Prince Eberwyn of Bentheim and Steinfurt (10 April 1882 – 31 July 1949)
 ∞ 1906–1914 Pauline Langenfeld (1884–1970)
 ∞ 1918–1919 Ellen Bischoff-Korthaus (1894–1936), who later remarried Adolf II, Prince of Schaumburg-Lippe
 ∞ 1920 Anne-Louise Husser (1891–1951)
Viktor Adolf, Prince of Bentheim and Steinfurt (18 July 1883 – 4 June 1961)
 ∞ 1920 Princess Stephanie of Schaumburg-Lippe (1899–1925)
 ∞ 1931 Princess Rosa Helene of Solms-Hohensolms-Lich (1901–1963)
Prince Karl Georg of Bentheim and Steinfurt (10 December 1884 – 14 February 1951)
 ∞ 1914 Princess Margarete of Schönaich-Carolath (1888–1980)
Princess Elisabeth of Bentheim and Steinfurt (12 July 1886 – 8 May 1959)
Princess Viktoria of Bentheim and Steinfurt (18 August 1887 – 30 January 1961)
Princess Emma of Bentheim and Steinfurt (19 February 1889 – 25 April 1905)
Prince Alexis Rainer of Bentheim and Steinfurt (16 December 1891 – 30 June 1923)
Prince Friedrich of Bentheim and Steinfurt (27 May 1894 – 17 May 1981)

Ancestry

References

1855 births
1925 deaths
People from Bad Arolsen
People from the Principality of Waldeck and Pyrmont
House of Waldeck and Pyrmont
House of Bentheim and Steinfurt
Princesses of Waldeck and Pyrmont
Princesses of Bentheim and Steinfurt
Daughters of monarchs